Foresman is an unincorporated community in Bolivar Township, Benton County, in the U.S. state of Indiana.

History
Foresman was established as a railroad station on the Kankakee, Beaverville and Southern Railroad.

Geography

References

Unincorporated communities in Indiana
Unincorporated communities in Benton County, Indiana